Andrea Pilzer (born 27 August 1991 in Trento) is an Italian curler from Cembra. He competed at the 2015 Ford World Men's Curling Championship in Halifax, Nova Scotia, Canada, as lead for the Italian team.

Personal life
Pilzer is currently a student

References

External links
 

1991 births
Living people
Italian male curlers
Sportspeople from Trento
Curlers at the 2018 Winter Olympics
Olympic curlers of Italy